Cornwall's rugged landscape and scenery have been used by film and television companies as a backdrop for some of their productions.

The most recent critically and commercially successful film to be made mostly in Cornwall was the 2019 musical comedy, Fisherman’s Friends and it’s 2022 sequel which in turn was inspired by the true story of the folk band of the same name and was shot in and around Port Isaac near Wadebridge. Cornwall's links with film and television go back to the 1930s when Jamaica Inn was shot at Bolventor but the oldest recorded films made in Cornwall date back to 1899 when a short, silent, black and white documentary film, Wreck of the S.S. Paris was filmed at the Manacle Rocks near the Lizard, and in 1904 black and white, silent film, sponsored by the Great Western Railway as a promotional film for holidays in Cornwall, called Scenes in the Cornish Riviera was filmed at the Royal Albert Bridge at Saltash, Looe, Polperro, Newquay, Truro, Falmouth, Penzance, St Michael's Mount, Lands End and St Ives.

In 1971, Sam Peckinpah's infamous movie Straw Dogs, starring Susan George, was filmed at St Buryan and Lamorna. More recent films featuring Cornwall include Saving Grace, set on the north coast around Port Isaac, Boscastle and Trebarwith Strand, and Johnny English, part of which was filmed at St Michael's Mount.

Cornwall's scenery came to particular prominence in the mid-1970s with the serialisation of Poldark, based on the novels of Winston Graham. More recent success has come with Doc Martin, Wycliffe, Wild West, Penmarric (1979 BBC TV series), Frenchman's Creek (1998 TV adaptation) and The Camomile Lawn (1992). In June 2007 it was announced that ex-Neighbours star Jason Donovan is to appear with former EastEnders actress Martine McCutcheon in ITV1's upcoming soap opera about surfing in Cornwall. The former soap stars play ex-lovers in Echo Beach, a post-watershed drama set in fictional coastal resort Polnarren. The show will run in tandem with Moving Wallpaper, a sitcom starring Ben Miller as a producer desperate to make Echo Beach a success.

The use of Cornwall as a film location has led to the establishment of ventures based in the area, including the £6 million South West Film Studios at St Agnes, now owned by Marilyn Gough, the Cornwall Film Fund, the Cornwall Film Festival, and the production company Mundic Nation.

List of film locations in Cornwall

 Make Up (2019) - St Ives Bay Holiday Park, Upton Towans, Hayle
 Bait (2019) - Charlestown and West Penwith
 Hinterland (2015) - Polzeath and Port Isaac 
 Cold and Dark (2005) - South West Film Studios at St Agnes
  Ladies in Lavender (2004) - Penzance and Helston areas.
 San Antonio (2003) - Widemouth Bay
 Johnny English (2003) - St Michael's Mount.
 Hornblower (2002) - Falmouth, Charlestown, Pendennis Castle, St Mawes, Rame Head.
 Die Another Day (2002) - Holywell Bay, Eden Project.
 Saving Grace (2002) - Port Isaac, Boscastle, Trebarwith Strand
 The Magical Legend of the Leprechauns (1999) - Watergate Bay, Bodmin Moor
 Mansfield Park (1999) - Charlestown
 Coming Home (1998) - Lelant, Prideaux Place (Padstow), Marazion.
 The Shell Seekers (1998) - Land's End, Lamorna, Marazion
 Swept from the Sea (1997) - Crackington Haven, Bodmin.
 Oscar and Lucinda (1997) - Boscastle, Port Isaac, Bossiney
 Rebecca (1997) - Charlestown
 Poldark (1996) - Rinsey (The Lizard), Lansallos (near Looe), Penrose Estate (Helston)
 Moll Flanders (1996) - Falmouth, Charlestown
 Twelfth Night (1996) Trebarwith Strand
 Blue Juice (1995) - Newquay, St Ives, Mousehole, St Agnes, Godrevy
 The Three Musketeers (1993 film) - Boconnoc
 The Witches - Headland Hotel, Newquay
 When the Whales Came (1989) - Bryher, Isles of Scilly
 "The Devil's Foot" (1988; episode of the TV series Sherlock Holmes, 1984-1994) - Kynance Cove, Mount's Bay, Lanyon Quoit, West Penwith.
 Doomwatch (1988) - Mevagissey, Polperro
 Never Say Never Again (1983) - Carn Brea, St Michael's Mount brief overflight.
 Dracula (1979) - Carlyon Bay
 The Eagle Has Landed (1976) - Newquay and Charlestown
 Malachi's Cove or The Seaweed Children (1974) - Trebarwith Strand
 Straw Dogs (1971) - St Buryan, Lamorna
 Magical Mystery Tour (The Beatles) (1967) - Newquay
 Night of the Eagle (1962) - Cape Cornwall, Porthcurno Beach
 Knights of the Round Table (1953) - Tintagel
 Treasure Island (1950) - Carrick Roads, River Fal, Helford River, Falmouth
 Johnny Frenchman (1945) - Mevagissey
 Miranda (1948) - Carlyon Bay, Polperro, Looe.
 Love Story (1944) - Minack Theatre
 Jamaica Inn (1939) - exteriors shot at Bolventor
 The Mystery of the Mary Celeste (1935) - Falmouth
 The Uninvited (1944) - "They call them the haunted shores, these stretches of Devonshire and Cornwall and Ireland which rear up against the westward ocean."
 About Time (2013) - St Austell

Television filmed in Cornwall
 Echo Beach - soap opera about surfing starring Jason Donovan and Martine McCutcheon to be filmed in Newquay.
 Doc Martin - comedy series starring Martin Clunes as a London doctor who comes to work in Cornwall. Set in Port Isaac
 Wild West (2002) - comedy series starring Dawn French, filmed at Portloe
 A Seaside Parish - a documentary about the Rector of Boscastle
 Wycliffe - Cornish detective series based on the novels of W. J. Burley - various locations.
 Frenchman's Creek (1998) - TV version of Daphne du Maurier's famous story
 The Camomile Lawn - wartime drama set in Cornwall, filmed at Veryan and Portloe
 Penmarric - BBC series about the lives of a Cornish family spanning the years from 1867 to 1940, from the novel by Susan Howatch
 Poldark - popular mid-1970s series based on the novels of Winston Graham that was remade in 2015 once again in Cornwall
 The Onedin Line - started in 1971 at Charlestown
 A Dorothy L Sayers Mystery - 1987 in the episode Have His Carcase the murder is filmed on Holywell Bay Beach

See also

List of topics related to Cornwall
Cornwall Film Festival

References

External links
 Visiting Cornwall film locations
 Visiting Cornwall television locations

Cornish culture
Geography of Cornwall
Mass media in Cornwall